Kaycee Lillian Hoover (born 20 February 1996) is an American-born Guamanian footballer who plays as a midfielder. She has been a member of the Guam women's national team.

International goals
Scores and results list Guam's goal tally first

Personal life
Hoover's sister Riley is also a Guamanian international footballer.

References

1996 births
Living people
Women's association football midfielders
Women's association football defenders
Guamanian women's footballers
Guam women's international footballers
American women's soccer players
Soccer players from California
Sportspeople from Orange County, California
People from Brea, California
Cal State Fullerton Titans women's soccer players